Slick Hare is a 1947 Merrie Melodies cartoon, directed by Friz Freleng. The film was released on November 1, 1947, and features Bugs Bunny and Elmer Fudd. It parodies the Mocambo nightclub in Los Angeles—in the cartoon referred to as "The Mocrumbo".  Mel Blanc voices Bugs, Arthur Q. Bryan voices Elmer Fudd and impressionist Dave Barry portrays Humphrey Bogart. The title is a pun on "hair", from an era when hair slicked down by oil was a popular fashion style for men.

Plot
The cartoon opens with various shots of 1940s celebrities dining and drinking at the Mocrumbo club—including such personalities as Gregory Peck using a straight razor to cut his steak (in reference to his character in Hitchcock's Spellbound), Ray Milland (in a spoof of The Lost Weekend) pays for his drink with a typewriter and receives miniature typewriters as change; and Frank Sinatra, depicted exaggeratedly thin, so much so that he slips into his straw when trying to take a sip from his drink. Elmer Fudd is a waiter at the Mocrumbo and comes out to find that his next customer is Humphrey Bogart.

Bogart tells Elmer that he wants fried rabbit. Elmer explains that the restaurant has run out of rabbits, but Bogart brandishes a tommy gun and warns Elmer he wants fried rabbit "within 20 minutes – or else!". During Elmer's frantic search for a rabbit, he hears the sound of somebody munching on carrots in a corner of the kitchen and discovers Bugs Bunny in a crate of carrots. Elmer informs Bugs that Bogart wants to "have" him for dinner. Bugs mistakes the concept for an invitation and immediately appears in a fancy dress and a top hat and asks to see what is cooking. Elmer quickly puts a hand mirror into a pot and Bugs, seeing his reflection, realizing that he himself is to be the main course, nervously bids Elmer farewell before beating a hasty retreat.

Bugs escapes the kitchen into the dining room, where he is seated at a table dressed like Groucho Marx in an attempt to fool Elmer. Elmer then appears next to Bugs, dressed as Harpo Marx. Bugs tries to run away, but he bounces off the large stomach of Sydney Greenstreet. He runs into Carmen Miranda's dressing room and hides in her tutti-frutti hat. Carmen walks to the stage and performs Sambaiana. As she exits, Elmer chases Bugs back onto the stage. Elmer, seeing the audience, quickly runs offstage, leaving Bugs to dance to the orchestra's samba rhythms. Elmer is seen next to the band sharpening his meat cleaver to the rhythm during the performance.

Bugs then makes his way back to the kitchen, where he revels in the audience's appreciation of his performance by saying "Ah, my public! How they love me! A-huh-huh!" (the little laugh being a Jack Benny shtick). Elmer, holding a meat cleaver, rushes towards Bugs, and Bugs immediately dresses as a mustachioed waiter, orders pies and twice splatters Elmer in the face. The third time (a comic triple), when Bugs orders a coconut custard pie with whipped cream, Elmer finally realizes that the waiter just might be Bugs. After producing the pie, Elmer throws it at Bugs, but Bugs ducks and the pie sails out into the dining room, hitting Bogart in the face. Bogart walks into the kitchen, grabs Elmer by his shirt, and asks him why he hit him in the face with a pie. Bogart then warns Elmer that he has just five minutes to prepare his fried rabbit.

Elmer searches frantically, but cannot find a rabbit in time. Bogart returns, and sticks his hand in his jacket menacingly. Elmer cowers, thinking Bogart is about to shoot him, but Bogart only pulls out a handkerchief to dab his forehead as he says resignedly "Baby will just have to have a ham sandwich instead." Upon hearing "Baby", Bugs jumps out of his hiding place and takes his place on a platter as the main course (Lauren Bacall being "Baby") noting "Remember, garçon, the customer is always right! If it's rabbit Baby wants, rabbit Baby gets!" before howling and wolf whistling at Bacall.

Production
Background artist Paul Julian visited the kitchen at the Mocambo, and based this cartoon's kitchen backgrounds on the unhygienic things he observed, later commenting in an interview: "I was so bloody revolted by it that I came back and made a documentary out of it!"

Reception
Cartoon voice actor Keith Scott writes, "One of the last of Warner Bros.' topical caricature cartoons, Slick Hare is much more accessible to a modern audience than some other entries in the movie-star parody genre. This is because Bugs Bunny and Elmer Fudd carry the comedy. With these two strong personalities in the foreground, the throwaway movie-star gags are more like the icing on a cake."

Cast
 Mel Blanc as Bugs Bunny, Waiter, Bartender and Ray Milland
 Arthur Q. Bryan as Elmer Fudd (uncredited)
 Dave Barry as Humphrey Bogart (uncredited)

Home media
This cartoon can be found on the Looney Tunes Golden Collection: Volume 2.
The short is also an extra on the DVD release of the 1947 Humphrey Bogart film Dark Passage, available individually and as part of the Bogie and Bacall: The Signature Collection DVD boxed set.

See also
 List of Bugs Bunny cartoons
 Mickey's Gala Premiere
 Mickey's Polo Team
 Mother Goose Goes Hollywood
 The Autograph Hound
 Hollywood Steps Out
 Hollywood Daffy
 What's Cookin' Doc?
 Felix in Hollywood

References

External links

1947 films
1947 short films
1947 animated films
Merrie Melodies short films
Films about Hollywood, Los Angeles
Short films directed by Friz Freleng
Animated films set in Los Angeles
Animation based on real people
Cultural depictions of actors
Cultural depictions of Humphrey Bogart
Cultural depictions of the Marx Brothers
Cultural depictions of Frank Sinatra
Films scored by Carl Stalling
Bugs Bunny films
Elmer Fudd films
1940s Warner Bros. animated short films
Films with screenplays by Michael Maltese